"I Gotcha" is the second single from Lupe Fiasco's debut album, Lupe Fiasco's Food & Liquor.
The song was produced by The Neptunes. "And He Gets The Girl" is featured as a B-Side to this single.

Music video
The music video for "I Gotcha" was directed by Kevin Hunter and filmed in Los Angeles. It was featured on MTV's show, Making the Video and was primarily shot in before a green screen. Pharrell, Lupe's sister, and many of his friends made cameo appearances in the video.

Track listings
CD single 1
 "I Gotcha"
 "And He Gets The Girl" (non-album track)

CD single 2
 "I Gotcha"
 "Pills" (non-album track)
 "I Gotcha" (Video)

US Promo single
"I Gotcha" (Radio Edit) – 3:59
"I Gotcha" (Instrumental) – 3:58
"I Gotcha" (Album Version) 3:58
"I Gotcha" (Acapella) 3:59
UK 12" Single
 "I Gotcha" – 3:58
 "I Gotcha" (Instrumental) – 3:58
 "I Gotcha" (A Capella) – 3:39
 "And He Gets The Girl"  (Non-album track)– 4:11

Personnel
Songwriters: Wasalu Muhammad Jaco, Pharrell Williams
Producer: The Neptunes
Recorders: Andrew Coleman, Brian Gartner
Mixer: Pat Viala

Chart positions

References

External links
"I Gotcha"  Music video at MTV

2006 singles
Lupe Fiasco songs
Song recordings produced by the Neptunes
Songs written by Lupe Fiasco
Songs written by Pharrell Williams